Acronicta lanceolaria, the lanceolate dagger moth or pointed dagger, is a moth of the family Noctuidae. The species was first described by Augustus Radcliffe Grote in 1875. It is found in North America, from Nova Scotia to British Columbia. It is listed as a species of special concern and believed extirpated in the US state of Connecticut. 

Adults are on wing in early June in one generation.

Reported larval hosts include Populus grandidentata, Salix and Rubus.

References

External links
 "Lanceolate Dagger Moth (Acronicta lanceolaria)". BugwoodWiki.

Acronicta
Moths of North America
Moths described in 1875